Cerastes vipera, common names Sahara sand viper and Avicenna viper, is a viper species endemic to the deserts of North Africa and the Sinai Peninsula. No subspecies are currently recognized. Like all other vipers, it is venomous.

Description 
 Adults average 20–35 cm (8-14 inches) in total length (body + tail), with a maximum total length of 50 cm (1.6 ft). Females are larger than males. Small and stout, it has a broad, triangular head with small eyes set well forward and situated on the junction of the side and the top of the head.

Their hunting strategy is unique when compared to that of other viperids because they use a combination of both sit-and-wait ambushing and active hunting. Active hunting is predominantly used in the months right before hibernation to increase energy intake before the long dormant period.

Common names 
Common names include Sahara sand viper, Avicenna viper, common sand viper, Egyptian asp, Cleopatra's asp, sand viper, Avicenna's sand viper, and lesser cerastes.

Geographic range 
In arid North Africa, it is found in Mauritania, Morocco, Algeria, Mali, Tunisia, Libya, Niger, Chad and Egypt. In the Sinai Peninsula, it is found in Egypt, Sudan and Israel.

The type locality given is "Ægypto" (Egypt).

References

Further reading 
Boulenger GA. 1896. Catalogue of the Snakes in the British Museum (Natural History). Volume III., Containing the...Viperidæ. London: Trustees of the British Museum (Natural History). (Taylor and Francis, printers). xiv + 727 pp. + Plates I.- XXV. (Cerastes vipera, pp. 503–504).
Joger, Uhlrich. 1984. The Venomous Snakes of the Near and Middle East. Beihefte zum Tübinger Atlas des Vorderen Orients, A, 12. Wiesbaden: Dr. Ludwig Reichert Verlag. 115 pp. .
Linnaeus C. 1758. Systema naturæ per regna tria naturæ, secundum classes, ordines, genera, species, cum characteribus, differentiis, synonymis, locis. Tomus I. Editio Decima, Reformata. Stockholm: L. Salvius. 824 pp. (Coluber vipera, p. 216).
Schnurrenberger, Hans. 1959. Observations on Behavior in Two Libyan Species of Viperine Snakes. Herpetologica 15 (2): 70-72. (Aspis vipera).
 Subach, A, Scharf, I & Ovadia, O. 2009. Foraging behavior and predation success of the sand viper (Cerastes vipera). Canadian Journal of Zoology 87: 520-528. PDF
 Subach, A. (2020). Using animal tracks to decipher the foraging mode of species capable of altering between the sit-and-wait and widely foraging modes: a case study of the sand viper Cerastes vipera. Israel Journal of Ecology and Evolution, 66(1-2), 94-100.

External links 

 

Viperinae
Reptiles of North Africa
Fauna of the Sahara
Reptiles described in 1758
Taxa named by Carl Linnaeus